Shaun Longstaff (born 3 January 1972) is a former rugby union footballer who played on the wing for Scotland.

Notes

Had 3 children and is now a successful international rugby agent.

1972 births
Living people
Alumni of the University of Dundee
Scottish rugby union players
Scotland international rugby union players
Caledonia Reds players
Glasgow Warriors players
Dundee HSFP players
New Zealand emigrants to the United Kingdom
People educated at Hutt Valley High School
New Zealand rugby union players
Rugby union players from Wellington City
Rugby union wings